USS Reedbird is a name used more than once by the U.S. Navy:

 , a coastal minesweeper placed in service 29 April 1941.
 , a minesweeper commissioned 9 August 1943.

United States Navy ship names